During the 1985–86 season, Red Star Belgrade participated in the 1985–86 Yugoslav First League, 1985–86 Yugoslav Cup and 1985–86 European Cup Winners' Cup.

Season summary
The last round of the 1985–86 Yugoslav First League finished with highly controversial results, as Partizan won the title. Slavko Šajber, the president of the Football Association of Yugoslavia, annulled the results of the last round and decided that all matches must be replayed. Partizan refused to play again, allowing Red Star to win the title and participate in the 1986–87 European Cup as Yugoslav champions. More than a year later, the Court of Joint Labour of SR Serbia returned the title to Partizan due to lack of evidence in match fixing.

Squad

Results

Yugoslav First League

Yugoslav Cup

European Cup Winners' Cup

First round

Second round

Quarter-finals

See also
 List of Red Star Belgrade seasons

References

Red Star Belgrade seasons
Red Star
Red Star